Circadian is a concept album and the first full-length studio album by 5th Projekt. It was released on August 29, 2006 on 5th Projekt's Organik Rekords. It explores the metaphysical relationship of humanity as it coexists with its environment and the cycles of which both partake and create. Music and lyrics were written by Tara Rice and/or Sködt D. McNalty.

Album concept

Circadian resulted from an interest in the effects of cycles and in the ways human individual rhythms interact with nature. It was produced by 5th Projekt, recorded from May–November 2005 at Toronto's Chemical Sound with James Heidebrecht, mixed by Ken Andrews (formerly of the band Failure), and mastered by Juno nominee João Carvalho, the album takes on the themes of balance and discovery.

The journey begins "In a Coma," "inspired by Yevgeny Zamyatin's 1924 novel We, a precursor to dystopian classics as Brave New World and Nineteen Eighty-Four. The opening piece sets the pace for the dreamlike lyrical exploration and the atmospheric compositions that characterize the album.

In "One to Throw Away," the central theme of disdain for the blatant disregard of ecosystems, both within ourselves and in the world around us, comes to light while the music paints a backdrop of darkness.

Artwork

The CD album was hand packaged in circular aluminum tins reminiscent of old cinema reel canisters, symbolic for the bands' cinematic sound and also for the conceptual approach to infinite cycles as they are influenced by the heavenly orbs of the sun and moon. The lid of the tin displays an ambigram of the title "Circadian," further emphasizing the predominant themes of unity and balance. Reinforcing these themes, the liner notes are also bound in a circular booklet depicting a clear glossed  graphic interpretation of an eclipse on the front and back covers. The CD album face is silkscreened in an homage to the vinyl 45s that were instrumental in leading each member to fall in love with music as young children, and complete the cycle by becoming the music maker later in their lives.

Track listing
 "Las Ventanas" (5th Projekt) – 1:19
 "In a Coma..." (McNalty) – 6:50
 "Oblivion" (Rice) – 5:40
 "Glockenspiel" (Rice) – 1:35
 "Distracktiid" (Rice & McNalty) – 4:47
 "Madness" (Rice) – 4:40
 "Spiders" (McNalty) – 6:19
 "Skepticosm" (Rice) – 4:23
 "tToDQ" (McNalty) – 1:58
 "One to Throw Away" (Rice) – 8:33
 "3ight Word5" (McNalty) – 5:48
 "Gna Gna" (McNalty) – 1:17
 "Broken Like This" (Rice) – 3:08
 "Resistance" (Rice & McNalty) – 5:31

Singles 
 "Broken Like This" -Track 12 – 3:08
 "In a Coma..." -Track 01 – 6:50

Videos 
 "Broken Like This"

In the Spring of 2007, Broken Like This was entered in the Universal Music Canada & Yahoo! Canada Up Your music video contest where it placed in the Top 10.

Charting

Personnel on all cuts 
 Tara Rice — Voice, Words, Electric, Acoustic & Classical Guitar, Glockenspiel, Keyboards, Programming
 Sködt D. McNalty —Electric, Acoustic, Backwards & Bowed Guitar, Voice, Words, Field Recordings, Keyboards, Programming, E-Bow, Gna Gna, Glockenspiel, Wood Blocks, Pint GlassProgramming, Percussion, Glockenspiel, Gna Gna
 Peter Broadley — Bass Guitar
 Nathan Kaye — Acoustic & Electronic Drums, Djembe, Shakers, Tambourine, Cabasa,

with

 Melanie Knight — Vocals on "Las Ventanas," "Skepticosm," "3ight Word5," "Broken Like This," "Resistance"
 James Heidebrecht — Backwards Piano & Backwards Guitar on "Broken Like This"

Additional Personnel:

 Engineered by James Heidebrecht
 Mixed by Ken Andrews
 Mastered by João Carvalho
 Produced by 5th Projekt - "Broken Like This" co-produced by James Heidebrecht
 Kreative Direktion & Design by strange//attraktor:

Notes

5th Projekt albums
Concept albums
2006 albums